Clymer and Climer is a surname. Notable people with the surname include:

Adam Clymer (1937–2018), American journalist
Ben Clymer (born 1978), ice hockey player
Benjamin Clymer (born 1982), American business executive
Eleanor Clymer (1906–2001), children's author
Ella Maria Dietz Clymer (1847–1920), American actress, poet
Floyd Clymer (1895–1970), motorcycle racer, dealer, publisher
George Clymer (1739–1813), Declaration of Independence signatory
George Clymer (inventor) (–1834), printer and inventor
Hiester Clymer (1827–1884), Pennsylvania politician of the Hiester Family
John Clymer (1907–1989), American artist
John B. Clymer (1887–1937), screenwriter
Mary Willing Clymer (1770–1852), Philadelphia socialite
Paul Clymer (born 1937), Pennsylvania politician
Otis Clymer (1876–1926), baseball player
Reuben Swinburne Clymer (1878–1966), American occultist
Wayne K. Clymer (1917–2013), American United Methodist bishop

Climber
 David Climer (1953–2020), American reporter
 Naomi Climer (born 1964), British engineer